Cumbres and Toltec Scenic Railroad (Denver and Rio Grande Western) No. 463 is a 3-foot narrow-gauge class "K-27"  "Mikado" type steam railway locomotive built for the Denver and Rio Grande Railroad (D&RG) by the Baldwin Locomotive Works in 1903. It is one of two remaining locomotives of D&RGW class K-27, the other one being No. 464 at the Huckleberry Railroad in Genesee Township, Michigan. The class eventually became known by the nickname "Mudhens". Today, No. 463 is operational on the Cumbres and Toltec Scenic Railroad between Chama, New Mexico and Antonito, Colorado.

Fifteen locomotives were built, originally class 125, then reclassified K-27 in 1924 when the D&RG became the Denver and Rio Grande Western Railroad (D&RGW). The K-27s were built as Vauclain compounds, with two cylinders on each side, expanding the steam once in the smaller cylinder and then a second time in the larger one. The extra maintenance costs of the two cylinders were greater than the fuel saving, so they were converted to simple expansion  in 1907–1909. They were Rio Grande's last purchase of compound locomotives. They pulled freight, passenger and mixed trains on the D&RGW in and over the Colorado Rocky Mountains, traversing the entire length of the railroad. They were built with their main structural frames outside the driving wheels, with the counterweights and rods attached outside the frames.

No. 463 was sold to cowboy actor and singer Gene Autry in May 1955. Autry never used the engine and donated it to the town of Antonito, Colorado. It was restored by and entered into service on the Cumbres and Toltec Scenic Railroad in 1994. It was taken out of service with a broken side rod in late 2002. In 2009, it was moved to the railroad's shop at Chama, New Mexico where a major rebuild was taken until completion in Spring 2013. On May 20, 2013, the restored locomotive made its inaugural run on the C&TSRR.

No. 463 was added to the National Register of Historic Places in 1975 as Engine No. 463.

See also

Rio Grande 168
Rio Grande 169
Rio Grande 223
Rio Grande 278
Rio Grande 315

References

 O'Berry, Dennis. (1995). The Mudhens, A Photographic History.

Railway vehicles on the National Register of Historic Places in Colorado
National Register of Historic Places in New Mexico
Conejos County, Colorado
463
Baldwin locomotives
2-8-2 locomotives
Railway locomotives introduced in 1903
Narrow gauge steam locomotives of the United States
Railway locomotives on the National Register of Historic Places
Preserved steam locomotives of Colorado
Individual locomotives of the United States
National Register of Historic Places in Rio Arriba County, New Mexico
3 ft gauge locomotives
Preserved steam locomotives of New Mexico